KFEZ (101.3 FM) is a 95,500-watt radio station licensed to Walsenburg, Colorado broadcasting an all 80s music format.  KFEZ serves the areas of Pueblo, Walsenburg, Rocky Ford, and Colorado Springs, Colorado. KFEZ is owned by Edward Magnus and is operated under an LMA by JP Marketing and Communications as of January 2019.

History

The station signed on the air on January 7, 2009, as KOCK with a rock format.

On April 22, 2010, KOCK went silent.

On April 26, 2012, the station returned to the air as KFEZ with a soft AC format, branded as "Easy 101.3".

On September 1, 2015, KFEZ changed their format from soft AC to sports, branded as "ESPN The Rock".

On December 15, 2015, KFEZ changed their format back to soft AC, branded as "Easy 101.3".

In January 2017, KFEZ changed their format to country as "Kiq'n Country," previously heard on KIQN 103.3.

On June 5, 2017, KFEZ changed their format to oldies, branded as "Cruisin' KFEZ 101.3 FM."

On March 31, 2019, KFEZ launched a Facebook page for its new All-'80s format, branded as "Gnarly 101.3."

Current live shows on Gnarly 101.3

Saturday 2pm-4pm          "Ladies Of The 80's" with Marissa.
Sunday   8am-10am         "Easy Like Sunday Morning" with Joel Navarro.
Sunday   10am-12pm        "Back To The Gr80s" with Missi and Paul.
Sunday   3pm-6pm          "Gnarly Grooves" with Big Len.

References

External links

FEZ
Classic hits radio stations in the United States